John I, Lord of Werle-Parchim ( – 15 October 1283), was from 1277 to 1281 to Lord of Werle and from 1281 to 1283 and to Lord of Werle-Parchim.

He was the eldest son of Nicholas I and Jutta of Anhalt.

After his father's death in 1277, he first ruled Werle together with his brothers Henry I and Bernard I.  In 1281, it was decided to divide Werle and John took over control of Werle-Parchim.

He was married with Sophia, the daughter of Count Günther of Lindow-Ruppin.

He died on 15 October 1283, and was buried in the Doberan Minster.

Children 
John's daughters are not mentioned in historic documents, only his sons
 Nicholas II, Lord of Werle, 1283-1316
 John II, Lord of Werle [-Güstrow], 1316-1337
 Gunter, Dean of Güstrow, and perhaps Magdeburg, died after 20 April 1310
 Henry, Dominican friar at Röbel Monastery, died after 17 March 1291
 Bernard, Dominican friar at Röbel Monastery, died after 24 August 1309
 Henning of Werle, died after 30 November 1311

External links 
 Genealogical table of the House of Mecklenburg
 Biographical information about John at emecklenburg.de

House of Mecklenburg
Lords of Werle
1240s births
1283 deaths
13th-century German nobility